Miriam Bernstein-Cohen, 1895–1991,  was an Israeli actress, director, poet and translator.

Miriam Bernstein-Cohen was born in Kishinev, Russian Empire. Her father was the doctor and community activist Jacob Bernstein-Kogan. She grew up in Kharkov. After training as a  medical doctor she enrolled in drama school. She studied with Konstantin Stanislavski in Moscow in 1918 before returning to Moldova as an actress, where she worked under the name Maria Alexandrova.

After immigrating to Palestine, Bernstein-Cohen  settled in Tel Aviv and joined the country's first professional theater company. In 1925, she founded the first Hebrew-language periodical in Palestine dedicated to theater, Te'atron ve-Omanut.

Awards and recognition
In 1975, Bernstein-Cohen was awarded the Israel Prize, for theatre.

See also
List of Israel Prize recipients
Theater of Israel
Culture of Israel

References 

1895 births
1991 deaths
Jews from the Russian Empire
Jews in Mandatory Palestine
Jews in Ottoman Palestine
Israeli Jews
Israeli stage actresses
Israel Prize women recipients
Israel Prize in theatre recipients
Israeli women writers
Emigrants from the Russian Empire to the Ottoman Empire
National University of Kharkiv alumni
Moldovan women writers